"True Original" is a song by Dave Audé featuring Andy Bell released on January 1, 2016.

The song reached number one on the US Billboard Dance Club Songs chart as of the issue dated March 12, 2016. It is the second song by the pair to reach number one, the first being "Aftermath (Here We Go)" which reached the summit in August 2014. Both Audé and Bell have made numerous appearances on the Billboard Dance Club Songs chart, with Audé reaching #1 thirteen times, and Bell four - his other two #1s were as the vocalist for the duo Erasure. Audé is now tied with Enrique Iglesias and Pitbull for most #1's among males on the US Dance Club chart.

Track listings
Digital download
 "True Original" (feat. Andy Bell) - 3:11
 "True Original" (feat. Andy Bell) [Extended Mix] - 4:09
 "True Original" (feat. Andy Bell) [Denzal Park Club] - 5:35
 "True Original" (feat. Andy Bell) [Denzal Park Dub] - 4:39
 "True Original" (feat. Andy Bell) [Stonebridge Mix] - 5:00
 "True Original" (feat. Andy Bell) [Stonebridge Dub] - 4:15
 "True Original" (feat. Andy Bell) [Nacho Chapado & Ivan Gomez Club] - 6:39
 "True Original" (feat. Andy Bell) [Nacho Chapado & Ivan Gomez Dub] - 6:39

Chart

Weekly charts

Year-end charts

See also
 List of number-one dance singles of 2016 (U.S.)

References 

2016 singles
Dave Audé songs
Andy Bell (singer) songs
Electropop songs
2016 songs
Songs written by Dave Audé